This is a list of notable companies based in Australia, a country in Oceania. For further information on the types of business entities in this country and their abbreviations, see "Business entities in Australia".

Australia is a wealthy country; it generates its income from various sources including energy and mining-related exports, telecommunications, banking and manufacturing. It has a market economy, a relatively high GDP per capita, and a relatively low rate of poverty. In terms of average wealth, Australia led the world in 2018, although the nation's poverty rate increased from 10.2% to 11.8%, from 2000/01 to 2013. It was identified by the Credit Suisse Research Institute as the nation with the highest median wealth in the world and the second-highest average wealth per adult in 2013.

Largest firms 

This list shows firms in the Fortune Global 500, which ranks firms by total revenues reported before March 31, 2017. Only the top five firms (if available) are included as a sample.

Notable firms 
This list includes notable companies with primary headquarters located in the country. The industry and sector follow the Industry Classification Benchmark taxonomy. Organisations which have ceased operations are included and noted as defunct.

See also 

 List of airlines of Australia
 Australian Companies in China
 List of banks in Australia
 List of breweries in Australia
 List of hotels in Australia
 List of magazines in Australia
 List of pizzerias in Australia
 List of pubs in Australia
 List of radio stations in Australia
 List of restaurant chains in Australia
 List of supermarket chains in Oceania
 List of oldest companies in Australia
 List of Woolworths Limited companies

References

External links 
Australian Companies Research Guide - State Library of New South Wales
National Names Index at the Australian Securities & Investments Commission
Australian Business Register by Department of Innovation, Industry, Science and Research

 

Australia
Wikipedia articles in need of updating from March 2013